Charles McGregor (September 1, 1922August 11, 1996) was an American actor, best known for his role as Fat Freddie in Super Fly. McGregor served twenty-eight years in a number of state prisons for two murders. During the 1970s, he became an actor and played supporting roles in several blaxploitation films. After his film career, he toured the United States and went to junior high schools and high schools, counseling children on the dangers of crime, drugs and prison. In 1980, he married Carolyn Pryor. He wrote his autobiography, called Up From the Walking Dead: The Charles McGregor Story with Sharon Sopher.

Filmography

References

External links
 Up From the Dead: The Charles McGregor Story at Amazon

1922 births
1996 deaths
American male film actors
African-American male actors
Male actors from New York City
20th-century American male actors
20th-century African-American people